The University of Saint Louis Tuguegarao is a private Catholic higher education institution run by the Congregation of the Immaculate Heart of Mary in Tuguegarao City, Cagayan, Philippines. It was founded in 1965 by the CICM Missionaries. It traces its roots from a diocesan secondary school named Cagayan Valley Atheneum established in 1938 by Msgr. Constant Jurgens, C.I.C.M., D.D., a Dutch by nationality, then Bishop of the Diocese of Tuguegarao and a CICM missionary and great educator. The CICM Fathers took over administration of the school in 1965 and renamed

University emblem and colors

Emblem
 The herald of the USL emblem blends the sword and the shield, symbolizing the virtue of fortitude. The sword thrusts forward toward individual and community development, the goals of education.
 The lily, symbolizing the virtue of integrity, and the cross, representing the faith in the Lord Jesus Christ, are wielded by the shield.
 The corn and rice (stalks), prime products of Cagayan, depict USLs commitment to contribute to the development of the Cagayan Province and Cagayan Valley Region.

School colors
 "Royal Blue" and "Pure White" are the colors of the Blessed Virgin Mary, signifying the love and life of a dedicated person close to Christ.

 The "Pure White" color is changed to "Yellow Gold" to represent the 50th years of existence in 2015.

CICM System of Schools
Other CICM run schools include:
Saint Louis College, San Fernando City, La Union
Saint Louis University, Baguio
Saint Mary's University, Bayombong, Nueva Vizcaya
Saint Louis School College- Cebu, Mandaue City, Cebu
Maryhurst Seminary, Baguio City
Maryhill School of Theology, Quezon City
University of Saint Louis Constant Jurgens Campus, Brgy. Leonarda, Tuguegarao City

See also 

Saint Louis University, Baguio City, Benguet 
Saint Louis College La Union, San Fernando City, La Union
Saint Mary's University, Bayombong, Nueva Vizcaya
 Ateneo de Tuguegarao

References 

Catholic universities and colleges in the Philippines
Universities and colleges in Cagayan
Education in Tuguegarao
1965 establishments in the Philippines
Educational institutions established in 1965